Generation X is a fictional superhero team appearing in American comic books published by Marvel Comics. A spin-off of the X-Men, the team was created by writer Scott Lobdell and artist Chris Bachalo. Generation X debuted during the 1994 "Phalanx Covenant" storyline, and appeared in their own monthly series in September 1994 with Generation X #1 (November 1994).

Generation X consisted of teenage mutants designed to reflect the cynicism and complexity of the series' namesake demographic. Unlike its predecessor the New Mutants, the team was not mentored by X-Men founder Charles Xavier at his New York estate, but by Banshee and former supervillainess Emma Frost at a splinter school in western Massachusetts.

The book's original creators left it in 1997. The series was cancelled with issue #75 in 2001. Sixteen years after the original series had ended, a second volume debuted in 2017 as part of ResurrXion with Jubilee mentoring a group of students in the rechristened Xavier Institute.

The team

Volume 1 
 
Unlike the X-Men and New Mutants, Generation X did not attend Xavier's School for Gifted Youngsters in upstate New York or learn from Professor Xavier himself.  Instead, they trained at the Massachusetts Academy, located in Berkshire County, Massachusetts, and were mentored by Banshee, an Irish X-Man who possessed a "sonic scream", and the former villain White Queen, an aristocratic telepath.

Generation X consisted of:
 Chamber (Jonothon "Jono" Starsmore), a British mutant who produced huge blasts of energy from his upper chest.  When his powers first manifested, they destroyed the lower half of his face and chest, leaving him with only his limited telepathic powers with which to communicate, and releasing him from any necessity to eat, drink, or breathe.  Because of this, he is characteristically sullen and bitter.
 Gaia, formerly the otherworldly Guardian of the Citadel of the Universal Amalgamator, which could potentially be misused to combine all sentient consciousnesses into a single entity. She was freed by Synch and eventually joined the team, but soon left to explore this world.
 Husk (Paige Guthrie), a Kentucky coal miner's daughter who could shed her skin, revealing a different substance each time. She is the younger sister of The New Mutants' Cannonball, and elder sister of Icarus.
 Jubilee (Jubilation Lee), a Chinese-American "mall rat" from Beverly Hills, California who could produce explosive energy.  Jubilee had been a junior member of the X-Men in the early 1990s, and joined Generation X to learn more about her powers.
 M (Monet St. Croix), a "perfect" young woman born into a rich family from Monaco who could fly, possessed super strength and had telepathic abilities.  Her arrogant manner was an annoyance to her teammates and her habit of going into deep trances or fugue states when deep in thought was a mystery to her teachers.  Mysteries surrounding the St. Croix family would play a big part in the series.
 Mondo, a cheerful, laidback Samoan mutant who could take on the texture of objects he touched.  Mondo eventually betrayed the team and was apparently killed by Bastion, but it was later revealed that this was a clone. The real Mondo appeared two years later, but as a villain teamed with Juggernaut and Black Tom Cassidy.
 Penance, a silent, childlike and mysterious mutant who possessed diamond hard, red skin and razor-sharp claws.  Penance appeared mysteriously at the Massachusetts Academy and at first, little was known about her.  According to the Generation X Ashcan, the writers originally intended her to be a girl named Yvette from Yugoslavia.  A hint of this can be seen when her mind is read by Emma Frost, revealing Eastern European tanks on the march in her memories.  This background was later changed by the following creative team.
 Skin (Angelo Espinosa), a former reluctant teenage gang member on the streets of East Los Angeles who possessed six feet of extra skin.  He could stretch his extremities, but mostly considered his mutation, which caused him to have sagging gray skin and painful headaches, a curse.
 Synch (Everett Thomas), an African-American teenager from St. Louis, known for his pleasant, supportive temperament, who could copy the powers of other mutants/superhumans within close, physical proximity.

Volume 2 
Following the war between the mutants and Inhumans, Kitty Pryde has Magik teleport X-Haven from Limbo to Central Park and renamed it the Xavier Institute for Mutant Education and Outreach. Jubilee teaches one of the classes consisting of students who are considered liabilities during missions and with personalities ill-fitting of an ambassador.
 Bling! (Roxanne "Roxy" Washington), an openly bisexual student with body made of diamond-hard material.
 Eye-Boy (Trevor Hawkins), one of the new mutants to manifest their powers after the war between the X-Men and Avengers whose body is covered in eyeballs, which gives him expert marksman skills and the ability to see through illusions, track peoples auras, see electrical and magical waves, and spot people's weaknesses.
 Hindsight (Nathaniel Carver), a new student who can use psychometry to see someone's past through skin contact.
 Kid Omega (Quentin Quire), an Omega level mutant possessing advanced cognitive and telepathic abilities.
 Morph (Benjamin Deeds), an average college student who has the power to shapeshift and chemically induce people into liking him.
 Nature Girl (Lin Li), a quiet student with heightened affinity for the natural world.

The series
Many members of Generation X debuted during the "Phalanx Covenant" storyline, a crossover spanning across every X-Men-related comic book in the summer of 1994.  The Phalanx, an extraterrestrial collective intelligence attempted to absorb many of Earth's mutants into its matrix and captured several of the young mutants who would make up Generation X as "practice" before moving on to the X-Men.

In September of that year, Generation X #1 was published, establishing the team at Frost's Massachusetts Academy.  It also introduced their nemesis Emplate, a vampire-like mutant who sucked the bone marrow of young mutants.  As the series continued, fans and critics raved about Bachalo's quirky, complex artwork and Lobdell's realistic teenage characters.  The series soon became one of the most popular X-Books.

Lobdell and Bachalo departed in 1997, leaving writer Larry Hama and artist Terry Dodson to reveal the long-standing mysteries behind M, Penance and Emplate.  Hama revealed that M was in fact an amalgamation of Monet St. Croix's two younger sisters, who could merge as part of their mutant powers (one was autistic, explaining the trances); Emplate was their brother who, after experimenting with black magic, was caught in a strange limbo and needed mutant bone marrow to escape; and Penance was the actual Monet St. Croix, transformed under one of Emplate's spells.  All of this was revealed in a surreal, mystic epic in Generation X #35–40 (1997–1998) that was greeted with disapproval by most fans (Lobdell's original plan had involved the twins, but did not include a "real" Monet).

The saga ended with the actual Monet St. Croix taking on the role of M, but fans' reactions did not get much better and sales began to dip.  Hama's successor, Jay Faerber, attempted to revive the title, bringing in a regular human student population at the school and making Emma's sister Adrienne Frost another headmistress in Generation X #50 (1999).

In 2000, writer Warren Ellis, known for his dark, sarcastic style, was hired to revamp Generation X, as part of the Counter-X rebranding of several second-tier X-titles (the others being X-Force and X-Man).  Ellis acted as 'plotmaster', while Brian Wood handled the actual scripting chores and later acted as sole writer of the series.  Fan response was positive, largely because Ellis and Wood dealt with the teenaged cast without resorting to cliché.  However, in early 2001, Marvel Editor-in-Chief Joe Quesada cancelled Generation X, in addition to five other X-Books, arguing that so many mutant superhero books had become redundant.  Also, X-Men writer Grant Morrison wanted to add a new cast of teenage mutants to the Xavier Institute in New York.  In Generation X #75, the team disbanded and the Massachusetts Academy closed.

After the series

Banshee
Banshee, distraught and possibly suffering from a breakdown, founds the X-Corps, a group of mutant adventurers who came into conflict with the X-Men over their questionable methodology and membership. Among the group are several former members of the Brotherhood of Mutants. It is revealed that Banshee was having the new Mastermind, the daughter of the deceased original Mastermind, manipulate the Brotherhood's members into having them work with him. However, it turns out that Mystique was posing as one of the members, Surge, and she is working with the new Mastermind behind Banshee's back. Mystique helps the brainwashed members to revolt; two members of the X-Corps are killed and Mystique stabs Banshee through the throat before being stopped by the X-Men. Banshee survives the attack and recuperates in the hospital.

In 2006's X-Men: Deadly Genesis, Banshee is killed by Vulcan, Cyclops and Havok's long-lost brother, while attempting to rescue an airplane full of innocents.  Later, Banshee's daughter Siryn takes the title of Banshee in his honor. Sean is latter resurrected by the Apocalypse Twins by the Death Seed as a Horseman of Death.

Chamber
Chamber starred a four-issue mini-series, X-Men Icons: Chamber, written by Brian K. Vaughan.

Later, after a reluctant recruitment into the X-Men, Chamber was an active part of the team in battles with long-time X-Men villains Mystique and Vanisher.  He subsequently underwent a mission for the X-Men (under the 'guidance' of Wolverine) to infiltrate Weapon X and learn the truth about the team.  During his time there, Chamber had his face and most of his body restored by Weapon X, as an incentive to join them.  He later disappeared with the rest of Weapon X when trying to contact Logan about 'Neverland'.

He subsequently reappeared as an attendee of the Excelsior support group (with his mouth and chest destroyed once more, supposedly in a bar fight) within the Runaways series, claiming he was "only there for the free pizza", despite once again no longer having a mouth with which to eat. It was revealed (to the reader, not to the rest of Excelsior) that he was merely someone posing as Chamber.

A mini-series titled Generation M debuted in November 2005, focusing on the after-effects from House of M, in which Scarlet Witch uses her hex/mutant powers to wish for "no more mutants". The first issue revealed a powerless Chamber (on life-support, due to missing the bottom of his face and most of his chest).

Chamber later showed up in New Excalibur #9 (September 2006) as a patient at a London Hospital, recounting to a so-called Dr. Hartley the story of how right before his powers burned out on "M-Day" they went supernova, once again destroying his face and chest.  They are interrupted by Pete Wisdom, who offers Chamber Excalibur's help.  As he leaves the two alone for a quick cigarette break, Hartley kidnaps Chamber.  Later, Chamber awakes to find himself fully healed, but looking similar to the X-Men villain Apocalypse as a side-effect.  He finds himself a guest of the new Clan Akkaba, worshippers of Apocalypse who had originally appeared in the Marvel limited series, X-Men: Apocalypse vs. Dracula.  In fact, Chamber's great-grandfather and Hartley, revealed to be Frederick Slade from the aforementioned limited series, were the only survivors of the original Clan Akkaba.  Slade reveals that they are all descendants of Apocalypse and that Apocalypse's blood healed Chamber, though he no longer has any powers.  Chamber tells them he wants nothing to do with them and is allowed to leave.  As he walks outside, he meets Excalibur and tells them in no uncertain words that he doesn't want their help or to have anything to do with any X-team.

After investigating the abandoned headquarters of Clan Akkaba, New Excalibur discovers that Chamber was lied to, and that he is indeed still empowered.  The consequences of this storyline have yet to be resolved.  Recently, he has appeared in New Warriors, going under the codename "Decibel", with Jubilee referring to him as Jono and sporting the same physical appearance given to him by Clan Akkaba.  Like most of the team, his new powers are more technological in nature, and it appears he can form solid energy projections or sonic blasts much like Songbird or Banshee. After the Age of X storyline concluded, Chamber appeared at the Jean Grey School with his mutant powers returned and is teaching mutants with physical deformities how to adapt to life with them.

Emma Frost
Immediately after Generation X'''s cancellation, Emma became a core member of Grant Morrison's New X-Men team where she demonstrated the secondary mutation of being able to transform her body into diamond.  During this time, she also began a romantic relationship with Cyclops. She has remained a central figure in nearly every incarnation of the X-Men since.

Husk
Husk, along with Jubilee and M, appeared as part of Banshee's X-Corps, dubbed "Banshee's Angels".  After Banshee was badly injured by Mystique, Husk returned to the X-Men's school in Westchester.  She became a regular cast member in Uncanny X-Men under writer Chuck Austen, and experienced a brief flirtation with Angel despite being many years younger than him.  She later drifted into the background as a supporting X-Men character, but sided with Wolverine in the X-Men's "Schism", where she served as a faculty member at the Jean Grey School for Higher Learning in Wolverine & the X-Men. She began to lose control of her powers, and when questioned by Shadowcat, abruptly quit her position.

Jubilee
Jubilee made several appearances in Uncanny X-Men following the end of Generation X, where she appeared first as a member of Banshee's X-Corps alongside M and Husk and later as an ancillary character in Chuck Austen's run.

She briefly had her own self-titled series, written by Robert Kirkman.  While it was originally intended to be an ongoing series aimed at the teen market, launched as part of Marvel Comics' Tsunami line, it was retroactively dubbed a mini-series and canceled with issue #6, due to disappointing sales.

Jubilee was also depowered during the "Decimation" storyline and was shown lamenting her lost powers, but reluctant to ask Wolverine for help, convincing herself that she needed to grow up and handle it herself. Subsequently, she was briefly shown in issue #2 of Generation M and later seen in Wolverine: Origins #10. After being injured after a battle with Omega Red, she was taken away for medical attention by S.H.I.E.L.D. She since returned in the second issue of New Warriors (vol. 4), in which she is known as Wondra and uses technology to mimic superpowers, in particular gauntlets which enhance her strength to superhuman levels. Recruited by Night Thrasher, she was suspicious of his motivations and his most outspoken critic.

During the "Curse of the Mutants" storyline, Jubilee became a vampire.  A subsequent four-issue mini-series, Wolverine and Jubilee, detailed her process of coming to terms with this change, and she remains a central cast member in X-Men, having found and adopted a baby named Shogo.

M
M appeared for a time as part of Banshee's X-Corps along with Husk and Jubilee, following which she became an employee of X-Factor Investigations, in X-Factor (vol. 3). She was an instrumental part of many of their investigations and, along with Strong Guy, considered the muscle of the group. After being seduced by a dupe of Multiple Man's, she developed a romantic interest in him, but his feelings lay with her teammate Siryn, which led to friction within the group. She has since made her peace with both Siryn and Madrox. M is currently appearing as a central character in Magneto's Uncanny X-Men.

Penance
Penance (now renamed "Hollow") appeared in the limited series Loners, where she was held captive by a ring of drug makers in order to harvest her genetics to create MGH. She was subsequently freed by Ricochet. After a battle with a crazed Phil Urich, she left, following him.  She re-appeared in late 2011 as a new student at Avengers Academy.

Skin
Jubilee and Skin were shown to be living in LA in a story in the anthology series X-Men Unlimited, sharing an apartment and attempting to adjust to civilian life. They were both, however, attacked by a mutant hate group in 2003 and Skin died after being crucified on the X-Men's front lawn. Writer Chuck Austen wrote the wrong name on his gravestone. The mistake was corrected in a short story in the anthology series X-Men Unlimited, where Iceman reminisced their brief friendship.

Members

Publications

List of titles
 Generation X Collector's Preview (October 1994, Marvel Comics)
 Generation X #−1 & 1–75 (July 1997 & November 1994 – June 2001, Marvel Comics)
 Generation X Annual 1995–1997, 1999 (September 1995 – November 1999, Marvel Comics)
 Generation X/Dracula Annual 1998 (October 1998, Marvel Comics)
 Generation X 1/2 (July 1998, Marvel Comics & Wizard Magazine)
 Generation X San Diego Comic Con 1/2 (July 1994, Marvel Comics, Overstreet)
 Generation X Holiday Special (February 1998, Marvel Comics)
 Generation X Underground Special (May 1998, Marvel Comics)

Significant stories
 Gen¹³/Generation X (July 1997, Image Comics) – Generation X has a crossover with Image Comics' Gen¹³.
 Generation X/Gen¹³ (December 1997, Marvel Comics) – Generation X meets Gen¹³ a second time.
 Marvel Team-Up #1 (September 1997, Marvel Comics) – Generation X teams up with Spider-Man.

Collected editions
First Series

Second Series

Adaptations
The TV film

In February 1996, the Fox Network aired a made-for-television Generation X movie, produced by Marvel Entertainment.  The film featured Banshee and Emma Frost as the headmasters of Xavier's School for Gifted Youngsters and M, Skin, Mondo, Jubilee and two new characters, Buff and Refrax, as students (Chamber and Husk were not written in because the budget didn't allow for the special effects their powers required).  The team battled a mad scientist who used a machine to develop psychic powers. Plans to develop a syndicated series that would air on the same night as popular sci-fi thriller The X-Files were abandoned.

X-Men '92
Issue 8 of the Infinite comic series ended with a version of Generation X appearing as new students under the X-Men. This team will include Jubilee, Chamber, Husk, Skin, and M.

Novels
 Generation X (1997, Berkley) by Scott Lobdell and Elliot S. Maggin, illustrated by Tom Grummett and Doug Hazlewood
 Generation X: Crossroads (1998, Berkley) by J. Steven York
 Generation X: Genogoths'' (2000, Berkley) by J. Steven York, illustrated by Mark Buckingham

Planned Fox Kids live action series
In 1999, there were plans for a Generation X live action series that would've aired on Fox Kids. The series never materialized. The only remnant of it comes from a 1999 Fox Kids/Fox Family upfront.

References

External links
X-Men comics on Marvel.com

Generation neXt
Review, captures, and clips from the TV film at Antimatter Multiverse

1994 comics debuts
Boston in fiction
Teenage superheroes
X-Men titles
Marvel Comics titles
X-Men supporting characters

pt:Geração X